In heraldry, an achievement, armorial achievement or heraldic achievement (historical: hatchment) is a full display or depiction of all the heraldic components to which the bearer of a coat of arms is entitled. An achievement comprises not only the arms displayed on the escutcheon, the central element, but also the following elements surrounding it (from top to bottom): 
 Slogan or war-cry
 Mantle and pavilion
 Crest placed atop a:
 Torse (or Cap of Maintenance as a special honour)
 Mantling
 Helm of appropriate variety; if holder of higher rank than a baronet, issuing from a: 
 Coronet or Crown (not used by baronets), of  appropriate variety.
 Console
 Supporters (if the bearer is entitled to them, generally in modern usage not baronets), which may stand on a Compartment
 Motto, if possessed
 Order, if possessed
 Badge, if possessed

Coat of arms
Sometimes the term "coat of arms" is used to refer to the full achievement, but this usage is incorrect in the strict sense of heraldic terminology, as a coat of arms refers to a garment with the escutcheon or armorial achievement embroidered on it.

Hatchment

The ancient term used in place of "achievement" was "hatchment", deriving (through such historic forms as atcheament, achement, hathement, etc.) from the French achèvement, from the French verb achever, a contraction of à chef venir ("to come to a head"), ultimately from Latin ad caput venire, "to come to a head", thus: "to reach a conclusion, accomplish, achieve". The word "hatchment" in its historical usage is thus identical in meaning and origin to the English heraldic term "achievement". However, in modern heraldry the word "hatchment" has come to be used almost exclusively to denote "funerary hatchment", whilst "achievement" is now used in place of "hatchment" in a non-funereal context. An example of the historic use of "hatchment" in a non-funerary context to denote what is now termed "achievement" appears in the statute of the Order of the Garter laid down by King Henry VIII concerning the regulation of Garter stall plates:
It is agreed that every knyght within the yere of his stallation shall cause to be made a scauchon of his armes and hachementis in a plate of metall suche as shall please him and that it shall be surely sett upon the back of his stall.

References

External links
 

Heraldry